Chalcides ebneri, also known commonly as Ebner's cylindrical skink, is a species of lizard in the family Scincidae. The species is endemic to Morocco.

Etymology
The specific name, ebneri, is in honor of Austrian entomologist Richard Ebner (1885–1961).

Conservation status
C. ebneri is only found in two small locations and has not been sighted since 1970. It is threatened by some agricultural practices and habitat loss, and populations presumably continue to decline.

Habitat
C. ebneri is found in rocky areas near grassy ground cover.

Reproduction
The females of C. ebneri give birth to live young, by ovoviviparity.

References

Further reading
Pasteur G (1981). "A Survey of the Species Groups of the Old World Scincid Genus Chalcides ". Journal of Herpetology 15 (1): 1–16. (Chalcides ebneri, new combination).
Schleich HH, Kästle W, Kabisch K (1996). Amphibians and Reptiles of North Africa. Koenigstein, Germany: Koeltz Scientific Books. 630 pp. . (Chalcides ebneri, p. 339).
Sindaco R, Jeremčenko VK (2008). The Reptiles of the Western Palearctic. 1. Annotated Checklist and Distributional Atlas of the Turtles, Crocodiles, Amphisbaenians and Lizards of Europe, North Africa, Middle East and Central Asia. (Monographs of the Societas Herpetologica Italica). Latina, Italy: Edizioni Belvedere. 580 pp. .
Werner F (1931). "Ergebnisse einer zoologischen Forschungreise nach Marokko. Unternommen 1930 mit Unterstützing der Akademie der Wissenschaften in Wien von Franz Werner und Richard Ebner. III. Amphibien und Reptilien ". Sitzungberichte der Kaiserliche Akademie der Wissenschaften in Wien 140: 271-318 + Plates I-IV + Maps I-III. (Chalcides ocellatus vittatus var. ebneri, new variation, p. 296 + Plate II, Figure 8). (in German).

Chalcides
Skinks of Africa
Reptiles of North Africa
Endemic fauna of Morocco
Critically endangered fauna of Africa
Reptiles described in 1931
Taxa named by Franz Werner